The following is an episode list for the 1980s undercover cop television series Miami Vice. In the United States, the show was aired on NBC. The first episode of the series premiered on September 16, 1984, with the series concluding on June 28, 1989, after five seasons. Due to its sensitive nature, The Final Episode was aired on USA Network thus concluding the series on January 25, 1990. There are a total of 113 episodes, spanning five years (1984–1989) of the show's run. The individual seasons are available on DVD in Regions 1, 2 and 4 and Blu-ray in Regions A and B.

Series overview

Episodes

Season 1 (1984–85) 
Season one of Miami Vice premiered on September 16, 1984, with the two-hour pilot premiere on NBC and concluded on May 10, 1985, after 22 episodes. Regular cast members included Don Johnson, Philip Michael Thomas, Saundra Santiago, Gregory Sierra, Michael Talbott, John Diehl, Olivia Brown, and Edward James Olmos.

The first season was filmed on location in Miami, Florida. The show's crew took up semi-permanent residence in the Alexander Hotel. They later worked out of Greenwich Studios.

The film crew on the show was 95% local to the Miami area. Various filming locations on the show included: Downtown Miami, Old Miamarina (Bayside Market Place), Opa Locka Airport, Biscayne Boulevard, Key Biscayne, Florida, Venetian Causeway, Coconut Grove, South Beach, North Miami Beach, St. Croix, McArthur Causeway, Ocean Drive, and Tamiami Trail.

Episodes were produced at an average cost of $1.3 million, much higher than the typical cop-show episode of $1 million. The show went to unusual lengths to get the right settings and props for each episode.

Music was an integral part of the show. Unlike other television shows at the time, Miami Vice would buy the rights to original versions rather than covers. The show would spend up to $10,000 per episode for original recordings by artists like Todd Rundgren, U2, and Frankie Goes to Hollywood. Jan Hammer, the show's musical composer, would create the rest of the show's musical score. Hammer used the Fairlight CMI IIx, a computer based music workstation consisting of an 8-bit sampler, digital synthesizer, MIDI controller and sequencer. The Fairlight enabled Hammer to score and perform the entire show's music single-handedly. Jan would work out of his state-of-the-art studio in his home in Brewster, New York composing the score for each episode.

Season 2 (1985–86) 
Season two of Miami Vice premiered on September 27, 1985, with the two-hour episode "The Prodigal Son". The second season concluded on May 9, 1986, after 23 episodes. Season two regular cast members included Don Johnson, Philip Michael Thomas, Saundra Santiago, Michael Talbott, John Diehl, Olivia Brown and Edward James Olmos.

Season 3 (1986–87) 
Season three of Miami Vice premiered on September 26, 1986, with the episode "When Irish Eyes Are Crying". The third season concluded on May 8, 1987, after 24 episodes. Season three regular cast members included Don Johnson, Philip Michael Thomas, Saundra Santiago, Michael Talbott, John Diehl, Olivia Brown and Edward James Olmos. Changes in season three included Dick Wolf joining the crew as executive producer working with Michael Mann, different style and fashion looks, the introduction of the Ferrari Testarossa, Sonny Crockett's new car and the death of Larry Zito (Diehl).

Season 4 (1987–88)
Season four of Miami Vice premiered on September 25, 1987, with the episode Contempt of Court". The fourth season concluded on May 6, 1988, after 22 episodes. Season four regular cast members included Don Johnson, Philip Michael Thomas, Saundra Santiago, Michael Talbott, Olivia Brown and Edward James Olmos. The episodes "The Big Thaw", "Missing Hours" and "The Cows of October" are considered among fans to be the worst in the series.

Season 5 (1988–90) 
Season five of Miami Vice is the final season of the series. The season premiered on November 4, 1988, with the episode "Hostile Takeover (Part 2)". The series concluded on May 21, 1989, with "Freefall", after 17 episodes, but later NBC aired three new episodes after the series finale. They were "World of Trouble" (June 14, 1989), "Miracle Man" (June 21, 1989), and "Leap of Faith" (June 28, 1989). Additionally, USA Network aired "Too Much, Too Late" on January 25, 1990, since NBC would not show that episode due to its strong topic of child molestation (NBC and USA are now owned by the same company). Season five regular cast members included Don Johnson, Philip Michael Thomas, Saundra Santiago, Michael Talbott, Olivia Brown, and Edward James Olmos.

† These "lost episodes" aired after the series finale aired on May 21, 1989. The first three episodes aired on NBC in June 1989, while the fourth one aired on USA Network in January 1990.
†2 The episode "Leap of Faith" was a backdoor pilot for a potential series that did not come to fruition.
‡ The episode "Too Much, Too Late" was not shown on NBC due to its graphic content and a plot vividly involving child molestation, which at the time was considered unsuitable for prime time television.

References

External links
List of Miami Vice episodes at Internet Movie Database

Lists of American crime drama television series episodes